Susan Renee Loepp (born 1967) is an American mathematician who works as a professor of mathematics at Williams College. Her research concerns commutative algebra.

Professional career 
Loepp graduated from Bethel College (Kansas) in 1989, and earned her Ph.D. in 1994 from the University of Texas at Austin, under the supervision of Raymond Heitmann. After postdoctoral studies at the University of Nebraska she took her present faculty position at Williams.  She has publications in Journal of Algebra and Journal of Pure and Applied Algebra.

Book 
With William Wootters, she is the co-author of the book Protecting Information: From Classical Error Correction to Quantum Cryptography (Cambridge University Press, 2006). The book covers topics in quantum cryptography and quantum computing and the potential impacts of quantum physics. These potential impacts include quantum computers which, if built, could crack our currently used public-key cryptosystems, and quantum cryptography which promises to provide an alternative to these cryptosystems.

Awards and honors 
In 2007, Loepp won the Young Alumnus Award from Bethel College. In 2010, she won the Northeastern Section of the Mathematical Association of America’s Teaching Award. In 2012, she won the Deborah and Franklin Tepper Haimo Award for Distinguished College or University Teaching of Mathematics of the Mathematical Association of America, which honors “college or university teachers who have been widely recognized as extraordinarily successful and whose teaching effectiveness has been shown to have had influence beyond their own institutions.”  In 2013, she was elected as one of the inaugural fellows of the American Mathematical Society.

References

1967 births
Living people
20th-century American mathematicians
21st-century American mathematicians
American women mathematicians
Bethel College (Kansas) alumni
University of Texas at Austin College of Natural Sciences alumni
Williams College faculty
Fellows of the American Mathematical Society
20th-century women mathematicians
21st-century women mathematicians
20th-century American women
21st-century American women